Veeraswamy is an Indian restaurant in London, located at 99-101 Regent Street. It was opened in 1926 by Edward Palmer, an Anglo-Indian retired British Indian Army officer, the grandson of an English general and an Indian princess. It is the oldest surviving Indian restaurant in the United Kingdom. In its early years, Veeraswamy served Anglo-Indian cuisine, but in recent decades, based on the popularity of authentic Indian food in the UK, has served a menu of regional Indian cuisine, including dishes from Punjab, Lucknow, Kashmir, and Goa. Edward Palmer used the name E. P. Veeraswamy for his food business and the book; Veeraswamy was his grandmother's family name. Initially it was spelled Veerasawmy, it became Veeraswamy because of a printing error.

History
Edward Palmer had considerable knowledge of Indian food, and lectured on the subject.  He founded E. P. Veeraswamy & Co. in Hornsey in 1896 to promote Indian foods "so that they could be used under Western conditions and yet produce Eastern results". He sold them under the trademark ‘Nizam’ an Indian noble title meaning viceroy.

In 1924 Palmer was engaged to advise the restaurant in the Indian Government Pavilion at the British Empire Exhibition in Wembley Park, Middlesex. Restaurants at the Exhibition were a monopoly of J. Lyons, but the Indian Government reserved the right to use Indian cooks.  They called in Palmer, "of Messrs. Veeraswami [sic] & Co." to serve as "Indian Adviser at the restaurant." This included providing some of the dishes served.

In 1924 the restaurant in the Indian Pavilion advertised itself thus: "If you appreciate Indian foods take your lunch at the Indian Pavilion."

The official Indian Government report for the 1924 season says "The Indian Restaurant with its curries drew large crowds, and at lunch and tea time on most days long queues formed up at the entrance." Of Palmer it says "his selection [as adviser] was happy, and the success of the Indian cafe was largely due to him.  The Indian cafe was not only appreciated by Indian visitors to Wembley who were able to get their vegetarian food, but was very popular with the British public." In 1924 the restaurant served an average of 500 curries a day.

For reasons both economic and political the Government of India did not participate in the Exhibition in 1925. The Indian Pavilion was turned into an 'oriental bazaar' selling goods from throughout India and Burma. However, the restaurant was retained, and this time was entirely run by Veeraswamy & Co. In 1925 the restaurant could seat 200 people.

Veeraswamy in Regent Street was not the first Indian restaurant in Britain (one had been opened by Sake Dean Mahomed in 1810), or the only one in 1926, but it was probably the first high-end one, and one of the first to cater to a largely European (though initially admittedly mostly ex-Indian Civil Service and Indian Army) clientele. It was certainly the first to cater to European royalty.

The restaurant was taken over by Sir William Steward in 1930. He was married to a singer and artist of the time Greta Gaye. Throughout the 1930s trade was very difficult but the couple used great resourcefulness and came through the challenging times. In 1915 Veeraswamy published a recipe book, Indian Cookery for Use in All Countries, which is still in print today. In the 1940s and 1950s the restaurant became a great success. The first ever curry in a can was introduced under Veeraswamy Food Products brand in the early 1950s. The restaurant was sold by Sir William in 1967. The food products business under the Veeraswamy name continued to be owned by the couple into the 1990s.

The restaurant decor was updated a number of times, and adopted an ultramodern theme in the late 1990s; however, for its 80th anniversary in 2006, it was redecorated in a 1920s motif. Veeraswamy is currently owned by the Chutney Mary group.

The origins of lager drinking with Indian food may be related to Prince Axel of Denmark's visit to the Veeraswamy-connected Indian restaurant at the British Empire Exhibition on 2 May 1924. He enjoyed his meal and later visited the Regent Street restaurant, apparently bringing a barrel of Carlsberg with him. He enjoyed his meal again, and decided to send a barrel of Carlsberg (the Danish royal beer) to the restaurant every year thereafter. The beer proved popular, so the restaurant started importing Carlsberg, and when waiters left to found or work in other Indian restaurants, they served Carlsberg as well.

Notable diners at Veeraswamy have included Winston Churchill, King Gustav VI of Sweden, Jawaharlal Nehru, Indira Gandhi, Charlie Chaplin and Ian Sinclair. Sir Abdul Qadir dined at the restaurant in February 1939, when the menu consisted of Mulligatawny Soup, Kashmiri fish, Chicken Madras and suji halva.

Veeraswamy was acquired by Ranjit Mathrani and Namitha Panjabi in 1997.  They restored the decor, creating opulent interiors evoking 1920s maharajal palaces.

In 2016 Veeraswamy was awarded a Michelin star.  The Michelin Guide inspectors said that "It may have opened in 1926 but this celebrated Indian restaurant just keeps getting better and better! The classic dishes from across the country are prepared with considerable care by a very professional kitchen. The room is awash with colour and it's run with great charm and enormous pride".

See also
 List of Indian restaurants

References

External links
 Official site

Further reading 
 Veeraswamy, E. P. - Indian Cookery: For Use in All Countries (Herbert Joseph, 1936)

1926 establishments in England
Anglo-Indian cuisine
British Empire Exhibition
Indian restaurants in London
Michelin Guide starred restaurants in the United Kingdom
Restaurants established in 1926